Noonthorangee Range is a mountain range in Australia. 

It is located in the state of New South Wales , in the southeastern part of the country, 800 km northwest of the capital Canberra.

The Ranges reach 199 m above sea level and its  coordinates are 30 ° 50'00 "S 142 ° 20'00" E

The area around Noonthorangee Range being open range lands, is almost unpopulated, with less than two inhabitants per square kilometer. In the neighborhood there is a hot desert climate. The annual average temperature is 22 ° C.  The warmest month is January, when the average temperature is 34 ° C, and the coldest is June, at 10 ° C.

The average annual rainfall is 278 millimeters.  The most rain fall is in February, with an average of 67 mm rainfall, and the driest is October, with 1 mm rainfall.

References

Localities in New South Wales